The Victoria Cross (VC) is a military decoration awarded for valour "in the presence of the enemy" to members of the Australia Armed Forces. It may be awarded to a person of any rank in any service, and to civilians under military command. Being the highest award in the Australian Honours Order of Wearing, the VC takes precedence over all other postnominals and Australian orders and decorations. The VC was instituted by Queen Victoria in 1856, initially to reward acts of valour during the Crimean War. Because of its rarity and inherent significance, the VC is highly prized, both as an award and as a collector's item, with one medal being sold for over A$1 million at auction. Australians have received the VC under the Imperial honours system and later under the Australian Honours System, when in 1991 a new but equivalent award was established by letters patent within the Commonwealth of Australia and its Territories, known as the Victoria Cross for Australia. The Victoria Cross for Australia has been awarded five times: twice to Special Air Service Regiment members, once to a member of the 6th Battalion, Royal Australian Regiment, and a posthumous award to a member of the 2nd Commando Regiment, and a posthumous award to Teddy Sheean. The first four were for actions in the War in Afghanistan while Sheean's was for actions during World War II.

The Imperial VC has been awarded to 96 Australians—91 were received for actions whilst serving with Australian forces, and another five to former members of the Australian forces then serving with South African and British forces. The majority of the awards were for action in the First World War when a total of 64 medals were awarded. Nine of these awards were for action during the Gallipoli Campaign. 20 medals were awarded for action in the Second World War, 6 in the Second Boer War, 4 in the Vietnam War and 2 in the Russian Civil War. Twenty-eight Australians have been awarded the medal posthumously. One recipient—Captain Alfred Shout VC, MC (who was also Mentioned in Despatches)—was Australia's most decorated soldier of the Gallipoli campaign. His Victoria Cross was posthumously awarded after Shout died of his wounds during the Battle of Lone Pine. Another 19 VCs have been awarded to soldiers who were either born in Australia, or died there, but did not serve in Australian units before being awarded the VC, and as such these are not included in this list.

Keith Payne is the only living Australian recipient of the original VC; there are three living recipients of the Victoria Cross for Australia.

Recipients

AWM = This denotes that the medal is held at the Australian War Memorial

Victoria Cross

Victoria Cross for Australia

References

Specific

General

 
 
 

Australia
 
Australian Army
Victoria Cross recipients